Northwinds is the second solo album by former Deep Purple singer David Coverdale, released in March 1978.

Background 
Originally entitled North Winds, the album leans more towards blues-based rock. Coverdale also touched on the genre in his previous album.

The original release of Northwinds contained eight tracks, with two more songs added on recent reissues. Four tracks ("Keep On Giving Me Love", "Queen of Hearts", "Only My Soul", "Breakdown") from this album would later be combined with the tracks from the EP Snakebite from his band Whitesnake, to form the album Snakebite.

A number of other titles, written by Coverdale, were published at the time, which have yet to be released. The titles include "It Would Be Nice", "Love's a Crazy Game", and "Till the Sun Doesn't Shine Anymore".

Track listing 
All songs were written by David Coverdale, except where indicated.

Side one 
 "Keep On Giving Me Love" (Coverdale, Micky Moody) – 5:16
 "Northwinds" – 6:13
 "Give Me Kindness" – 4:34
 "Time & Again" – 4:02

Side two 
 "Queen of Hearts" (Coverdale, Moody) – 5:16
 "Only My Soul" – 4:36
 "Say You Love Me" – 4:21
 "Breakdown" (Coverdale, Moody) – 5:15

Bonus tracks on the 2000 CD reissue 
 "Shame the Devil" – 3:35
 "Sweet Mistreater" – 3:45

On the original LP release, "Northwinds" is the first track and "Keep On Giving Me Love" is the second; on later reissues these are swapped.

Personnel 
Musicians

 David Coverdale – lead vocals, piano ("Northwinds"), electric piano ("Give Me Kindness" and "Time and Again")
 Micky Moody – guitars, backing vocals
 Tim Hinkley – keyboards, backing vocals
 Alan Spenner – bass
 Tony Newman – drums, percussion
 Roger Glover – synthesizer, clavinet, cowbell, production
  – violin
 Lee Brilleaux – harmonica on "Keep On Giving Me Love"
 Ronnie James Dio, Wendy Dio – backing vocals on "Give Me Kindness"

References

External links 
 

1978 albums
David Coverdale albums
Albums produced by Roger Glover
Purple Records albums
Polydor Records albums
Victor Entertainment albums
Blues rock albums by British artists